The Bell Beaker culture, also known as the Bell Beaker complex or Bell Beaker phenomenon, is an archaeological culture named after the inverted-bell beaker drinking vessel used at the very beginning of the European Bronze Age. Arising from around 2800 BC, it lasted in Britain until as late as 1800 BC but in continental Europe only until 2300 BC, when it was succeeded by the Unetice culture. The culture was widely dispersed throughout Western Europe, being  present in many regions of Iberia and stretching eastward to the Danubian plains, and northward to the islands of Great Britain and Ireland, and was also present in the islands of Sardinia and Sicily and some small coastal areas in north-western Africa. The Bell Beaker phenomenon shows substantial regional variation, and a study from 2018 found that it was associated with genetically diverse populations.

The Bell Beaker culture was partly preceded by and contemporaneous with the Corded Ware culture, and in north-central Europe preceded by the Funnelbeaker culture. The name  was coined for its distinctive style of beakers by Paul Reinecke in 1900. The term's English translation Bell Beaker was introduced by John Abercromby in 1904.

In its early phase, the Bell Beaker culture can be seen as the western contemporary of the Corded Ware culture of Central Europe. From about 2400 BC the Beaker folk culture expanded eastwards, into the Corded Ware horizon. In parts of Central and Eastern Europe, as far east as Poland, a sequence occurs from Corded Ware to Bell Beaker.

This period marks a period of cultural contact in Atlantic and Western Europe following a prolonged period of relative isolation during the Neolithic.

In its mature phase, the Bell Beaker culture is understood as not only a collection of characteristic artefact types, but a complex cultural phenomenon involving metalwork in copper and gold, long-distance exchange networks, archery, specific types of ornamentation, and (presumably) shared ideological, cultural and religious ideas, as well as social stratification and the emergence of regional elites. A wide range of regional diversity persists within the widespread late Beaker culture, particularly in local burial styles (including incidences of cremation rather than burial), housing styles, economic profile, and local ceramic wares. Nonetheless, according to Lemercier (2018) the mature phase of the Beaker culture represents "the appearance of a kind of Bell Beaker civilization of continental scale."

Origins and expansion

Origins

The Bell Beaker artefacts (at least in their early phase) are not distributed across a contiguous area, as is usual for archaeological cultures, but are found in insular concentrations scattered across Europe. Their presence is not associated with a characteristic type of architecture or of burial customs. However, the Bell Beaker culture does appear to coalesce into a coherent archaeological culture in its later phase.

The origin of the "Bell Beaker" artefacts has been traced to the early 3rd millennium, with early examples of the "maritime" Bell Beaker design having been found at the Tagus estuary in Portugal, radiocarbon dated to c. the 28th century BC. The inspiration for the Maritime Bell Beaker is argued to have been the small and earlier Copoz beakers that have impressed decoration and which are found widely around the Tagus estuary in Portugal. Turek sees late Neolithic precursors in northern Africa, arguing the Maritime style emerged as a result of seaborne contacts between Iberia and Morocco in the first half of the third millennium BC.

More recent analyses of the "Beaker phenomenon", published since the 2000s, have persisted in describing the origin of the "Beaker phenomenon" as arising from a synthesis of elements, representing "an idea and style uniting different regions with different cultural traditions and background."

Expansion and Corded Ware contacts

The initial moves from the Tagus estuary were maritime. A southern move led to the Mediterranean where 'enclaves' were established in south-western Spain and southern France around the Golfe du Lion and into the Po Valley in Italy, probably via ancient western Alpine trade routes used to distribute jadeite axes. A northern move incorporated the southern coast of Armorica. The enclave established in southern Brittany was linked closely to the riverine and landward route, via the Loire, and across the Gâtinais Valley to the Seine Valley, and thence to the lower Rhine. This was a long-established route reflected in early stone axe distributions, and via this network, Maritime Bell Beakers first reached the Lower Rhine in about 2600 BC.

Another expansion brought Bell Beaker to Csepel Island in Hungary by about 2500 BC. In the Carpathian Basin, the Bell Beaker culture came in contact with communities such as the Vučedol culture (c. 3000–2200 BC), which had evolved partly from the Yamnaya culture (c. 3300–2600 BC). In contrast to the early Bell Beaker preference for the dagger and bow, the favourite weapon in the Carpathian Basin during the first half of the third millennium was the shaft-hole axe. Here, Bell Beaker people assimilated local pottery forms such as the polypod cup. These "common ware" types of pottery then spread in association with the classic bell beaker.

The Rhine was on the western edge of the vast Corded Ware zone (c. 3100–2350 BC), forming a contact zone with the Bell Beaker culture. From there, the Bell Beaker culture spread further into Eastern Europe, replacing the Corded Ware culture up to the Vistula (Poland).

A review in 2014 revealed that single burial, communal burial, and reuse of Neolithic burial sites are found throughout the Bell Beaker zone. This overturns a previous conviction that single burial was unknown in the early or southern Bell Beaker zone, and so must have been adopted from Corded Ware in the contact zone of the Lower Rhine, and transmitted westwards along the exchange networks from the Rhine to the Loire, and northwards across the English Channel to Britain.

The earliest copper production in Ireland, identified at Ross Island in the period 2400–2200 BC, was associated with early Beaker pottery. Here, the local sulpharsenide ores were smelted to produce the first copper axes used in Britain and Ireland. The same technologies were used in the Tagus region and in the west and south of France. The evidence is sufficient to support the suggestion that the initial spread of Maritime Bell Beakers along the Atlantic and into the Mediterranean, using sea routes that had long been in operation, was directly associated with the quest for copper and other rare raw materials.

Migration vs. acculturation

While Bell Beaker (Glockenbecher) was introduced as a term for the artefact type at the beginning of the 20th century, 
recognition of an archaeological Bell Beaker culture has long been controversial. Its spread has been one of the central questions of the migrationism vs. diffusionism debate in 20th-century archaeology, variously described as due to migration, possibly of small groups of warriors, craftsmen or traders, or due to the diffusion of ideas and object exchange.

Migration

Given the unusual form and fabric of Beaker pottery, and its abrupt appearance in the archaeological record, along with a characteristic group of other artefacts, known as the Bell Beaker "package", the explanation for the Beaker culture until the last decades of the 20th century was to interpret it as the migration of one group of people across Europe.

Gordon Childe interpreted the presence of its characteristic artefact as the intrusion of "missionaries" expanding from Iberia along the Atlantic coast, spreading knowledge of copper metallurgy. Stephen Shennan interpreted the artefacts as belonging to a mobile cultural elite imposing itself over the indigenous substrate populations. Similarly, Sangmeister (1972) interpreted the "Beaker folk" (Glockenbecherleute) as small groups of highly mobile traders and artisans. Christian Strahm (1995) used the term "Bell Beaker phenomenon" (Glockenbecher-Phänomen) as a compromise in order to avoid the term "culture".

Heyd (1998) concluded that the Bell Beaker culture was intrusive to southern Germany, and existed contemporarily with the local Corded Ware culture.

The burial ritual which typified Bell Beaker sites appears to be intrusive to Western Europe, from Central Europe. Individual inhumations, often under tumuli with the inclusion of weapons contrast markedly to the preceding Neolithic traditions of often collective, weaponless burials in Atlantic/Western Europe. Such an arrangement is rather derivative of Corded Ware traditions.

Cultural diffusion

British and American archaeology since the 1960s have been sceptical about prehistoric migration in general, so the idea of "Bell Beaker Folk" lost ground. A theory of cultural contact de-emphasizing population movement was presented by Colin Burgess and Stephen Shennan in the mid-1970s.

Under the "pots, not people" theory, the Beaker culture is seen as a 'package' of knowledge (including religious beliefs, as well as methods of copper, bronze, and gold working) and artefacts (including copper daggers, v-perforated buttons, and stone wrist-guards) adopted and adapted by the indigenous peoples of Europe to varying degrees. This new knowledge may have come about by any combination of population movements and cultural contact. An example might be as part of a prestige cult related to the production and consumption of beer, or trading links such as those demonstrated by finds made along the seaways of Atlantic Europe. Palynological studies including analysis of pollen, associated with the spread of beakers, certainly suggests increased growing of barley, which may be associated with beer brewing. Noting the distribution of Beakers was highest in areas of transport routes, including fording sites, river valleys and mountain passes, Beaker 'folk' were suggested to be originally bronze traders, who subsequently settled within local Neolithic or early Chalcolithic cultures, creating local styles. Close analysis of the bronze tools associated with beaker use suggests an early Iberian source for the copper, followed subsequently by Central European and Bohemian ores.

AOO and AOC Beakers appear to have evolved continually from a pre-Beaker period in the lower Rhine and North Sea regions, at least for Northern and Central Europe.

Renewed emphasis on migration

Investigations in the Mediterranean and France recently moved the discussion to re-emphasise the importance of migration to the Bell Beaker story. Instead of being pictured as a fashion or a simple diffusion of objects and their use, the investigation of over 300 sites showed that human groups actually moved in a process that involved explorations, contacts, settlement, diffusion, and acculturation/assimilation. Some elements show the influence from the north and east, and other elements reveal the south-east of France to be an important crossroad on an important route of communication and exchange spreading north. A distinctive 'barbed wire' pottery decoration is thought to have migrated through central Italy first. The pattern of movements was diverse and complicated, along the Atlantic coast and the northern Mediterranean coast, and sometimes also far inland. The prominent central role of Portugal in the region and the quality of the pottery all across Europe are forwarded as arguments for a new interpretation that denies an ideological dimension.

Genetic findings also lend support to the migratory hypothesis. Price et al. (1998), in a strontium isotope analysis of 86 people from Bell Beaker graves in Bavaria, suggest that 18–25% of all graves were occupied by people who came from a considerable distance outside the area. This was true of children and adults, indicative of some significant migration wave. Given the similarities with readings from people living on loess soils, the general direction of the local movement, according to Price et al., is from the northeast to the southwest.

Archaeogenetics studies of the 2010s have been able to resolve the "migrationist vs. diffusionist" question to some extent. The study by Olalde et al. (2017) found only "limited genetic affinity" between individuals associated with the Beaker complex in Iberia and in Central Europe, suggesting that migration played a limited role in its early spread. However, the same study found that the further dissemination of the mature Beaker complex was very strongly linked to migration. This is true especially for Britain, where the spread of the Beaker culture introduced high levels of steppe-related ancestry, resulting in a near-complete transformation of the local gene pool within a few centuries, to the point of replacement of about 90% of the local Neolithic-derived lineages.

Bell Beaker artefacts

The two main international bell beaker styles are: the All Over Ornamented (AOO), patterned all over with impressions, of which a subset is the All Over Corded (AOC), patterned with cord-impressions, and the Maritime type, decorated with bands filled with impressions made with a comb or cord. Later, other characteristic regional styles developed.

The beakers are suggested to have been designed for the consumption of alcohol, and the introduction of the substance to Europe may have fuelled the beakers' spread. Beer and mead content have been identified from certain examples. However, not all Beakers were drinking cups. Some were used as reduction pots to smelt copper ores, others have some organic residues associated with food, and still others were employed as funerary urns. They were used as status display amongst disparate elites.

Postulated linguistic connections

As the Beaker culture left no written records, all theories regarding the language or languages they spoke remain conjectural. It has been suggested as a candidate for an early Indo-European culture, or as the origin of the Vasconic substrate.

James Mallory (2013) notes that the Beaker culture was associated with a hypothetical cluster of Indo-European dialects termed "North-West Indo-European," a cluster which includes the (predecessors of) Celtic, Italic, Germanic and Balto-Slavic branches.

Earlier theories suggested a link to the hypothesised Italo-Celtic, or Proto-Celtic languages.

Physical anthropology

Historical craniometric studies found that the Beaker people appeared to be of a different physical type than those earlier populations in the same geographic areas. They were described as tall, heavy boned and brachycephalic. The early studies on the Beakers which were based on the analysis of their skeletal remains, were craniometric. This apparent evidence of migration was in line with archaeological discoveries linking Beaker culture to new farming techniques, mortuary practices, copper-working skills, and other cultural innovations. However, such evidence from skeletal remains was brushed aside as a new movement developed in archaeology from the 1960s, which stressed cultural continuity. Anti-migrationist authors either paid little attention to skeletal evidence or argued that differences could be explained by environmental and cultural influences. Margaret Cox and Simon Mays sum up the position: "Although it can hardly be said that craniometric data provide an unequivocal answer to the problem of the Beaker folk, the balance of the evidence would at present seem to favour a migration hypothesis."

Non-metrical research concerning the Beaker people in Britain also cautiously pointed in the direction of migration. Subsequent studies, such as one concerning the Carpathian Basin, and a non-metrical analysis of skeletons in central-southern Germany, have also identified marked typological differences with the pre-Beaker inhabitants.

Jocelyne Desideri examined the teeth in skeletons from Bell Beaker sites in Northern Spain, Southern France, Switzerland, the Czech Republic and Hungary. Examining dental characteristics that have been independently shown to correlate with genetic relatedness, she found that only in Northern Spain and the Czech Republic were there demonstrable links between immediately previous populations and Bell Beaker populations. Elsewhere there was a discontinuity.

Genetics

Lee et al. (2012) detected R1b two male skeletons from a German Bell Beaker site dated to 2600–2500 BC at Kromsdorf, one of which tested positive for M269 but negative for its U106 subclade (note that the P312 subclade was not tested for), while for the other skeleton the M269 test was unclear.

Haak et al. (2015) analysed the remains of a later Bell Beaker male skeleton from Quedlinburg, Germany, dated to 2296–2206 BC. The individual carried haplogroup R1b1a2a1a2 (R-P312). The study found that the Bell Beakers and people of the Unetice culture had less ancestry from the Yamnaya culture compared to the earlier Corded Ware culture. The authors took this to be a sign of a resurgence of the indigenous inhabitants of Western Europe in the aftermath of the Yamnaya expansion.

Allentoft et al. (2015) found the people of the Beaker culture to be closely genetically related to the Corded Ware culture, the Unetice culture and the Nordic Bronze Age.

In yet another 2015 study published in Nature, the remains of eight individuals ascribed to the Beaker culture were analysed. Two individuals were determined to belong to Haplogroup R1, while the remaining six were determined to belong to haplogroup R1b1a2 and various subclades of it.

A study published in Nature in 2018 confirmed a massive population turnover in western Europe asssociated with the Bell Beaker culture, but also noted that the earliest Bell Beaker samples in Iberia completely lacked Western Steppe Herder ancestry. Both men and women of Western Steppe Herder ancestry participated in the turnover in Neolithic Britain, as evidenced by the rise of the paternal haplogroup R1b and maternal haplogroups I, R1a and U4. The study also found that the Bell Beaker arrivals in Neolithic Britian had significantly higher genetic variants associated with light skin and eye pigmentation than the local population, but very low frequencies of the SNP associated with lactase persistance in modern Europeans.

Furtwängler et al. (2020) analysed 96 ancient genomes from Switzerland, Southern Germany, and the Alsace region in France, covering the Middle/Late Neolithic to Early Bronze Age. They confirmed that R1b arrived in the region during the transitory Bell Beaker period (2800-1800 BC). The vast majority of Bell Beaker R1b samples belonged to the U152 > L2 clade (11 out of 14; the other being P312 or L51).

Papac et al. (2021) found in the region of Bohemia, Czech Republic, Bell Beaker culture's male individuals featuring Y-haplogroup R1b-P312, radiocarbon-dated to between 2400 and 2100 BC.

Extent and impact
Bell Beaker people took advantage of transport by sea and rivers, creating a cultural spread extending from Ireland to the Carpathian Basin and south along the Atlantic coast and along the Rhône valley to Portugal, North Africa, and Sicily, even penetrating northern and central Italy. Its remains have been found in what is now Portugal, Spain, France (excluding the central massif), Ireland and Great Britain, the Low Countries and Germany between the Elbe and Rhine, with an extension along the upper Danube into the Vienna Basin (Austria), Hungary and the Czech Republic, with Mediterranean outposts on Sardinia and Sicily; there is less certain evidence for direct penetration in the east.

Beaker-type vessels remained in use longest in the British Isles; late beakers in other areas are classified as early Bronze Age (Barbed Wire Beakers in the Netherlands, Giant Beakers (Riesenbecher)). The new international trade routes opened by the Beaker people became firmly established and the culture was succeeded by a number of Bronze Age cultures, among them the Únětice culture in Central Europe, the Elp culture and Hilversum culture in the Netherlands, the Atlantic Bronze Age in the British Isles and the Atlantic coast of Europe, and by the Nordic Bronze Age, a culture of Scandinavia and northernmost Germany–Poland.

Iberian Peninsula

The Bell Beaker phenomenon in the Iberian Peninsula defines the late phase of the local Chalcolithic and even intrudes in the earliest centuries of the Bronze Age. A review of radiocarbon dates for Bell Beaker across Europe found that some of the earliest were found in Portugal, where the range from Zambujal and Cerro de la Virgen (Spain) ran , in contrast to the rather later range for Andalusia.

At present, no internal chronology for the various Bell Beaker-related styles has been achieved yet for Iberia. Peninsular corded Bell Beakers are usually found in coastal or near coastal regions in three main regions: the western Pyrenees, the lower Ebro and adjacent east coast, and the northwest (Galicia and northern Portugal). A corded-zoned Maritime variety (C/ZM), proposed to be a hybrid between AOC and Maritime Herringbone, was mainly found in burial contexts and expanded westward, especially along the mountain systems of the Meseta.

With some notable exceptions, most Iberian early Bell Beaker "burials" are at or near the coastal regions. As for the settlements and monuments within the Iberian context, Beaker pottery is generally found in association with local Chalcolithic material and appears most of all as an "intrusion" from the third millennium in burial monuments whose origin may go back to the fourth or fifth millennia BC.

Very early dates for Bell Beakers were found in Castelo Velho de Freixo de Numão in Guarda, northern Portugal. The site was located on the summit of a spur. A short-lived first occupation of pre-Bell Beaker building phase about 3000 BC revealed the remains of a tower, some pavings, and structures for burning. After a break of one or two centuries, Bell Beaker pottery was introduced in a second building phase that lasted to the Early Bronze Age, about 1800 BC. A third building phase followed directly and lasted to about 1300 BC, after which the site was covered with layers of stone and clay, apparently deliberately, and abandoned.

The second building phase was dominated by a highly coherent group of pottery within the regional Chalcolithic styles, representing Maritime Bell Beakers of the local (northern Portuguese), penteada decoration style in various patterns, using lines of points, incision or impression. Three of them were carbon dated to the first half of the third millennium BC. The site demonstrates a notable absence of more common Bell Beaker pottery styles such as Maritime Herringbone and Maritime Lined varieties found in nearby sites such as Castanheiro do Vento and Crasto de Palheiros. One non-local Bell Beaker sherd, however, belonging to the upper part of a beaker with a curved neck and thin walls, was found at the bedrock base of this second phase. The technique and patterning are classic forms in the context of pure European and Peninsular corded ware. In the Iberian Peninsula, this AOC type was traditionally restricted to half a dozen scattered sites in the western Pyrenees, the lower Ebro, and the Spanish east coast; especially a vessel at Filomena at Villarreal, Castellón (Spain), has parallels with the decoration. In Porto Torrão, at inner Alentejo (southern Portugal), a similar vessel was found having a date ultimately corrected to around 2823–2658 BC. All pottery was locally made. The lack or presence of Bell Beaker elements is the basis for the division of Los Millares and Vila Nova cultures into two periods: I and II.

Balearic Islands

Radiocarbon dating currently indicates a 1,200-year duration for the use of the Beaker pottery on the Balearic Islands, between about 2475 and 1300 BC. Some evidence exists of all-corded pottery in Mallorca, generally considered the most ancient Bell Beaker pottery, possibly indicating an even earlier Beaker settlement about 2700 BC. However, in several regions, this type of pottery persisted long enough to permit other possibilities. Suárez Otero (1997) postulated this corded Beakers entered the Mediterranean by routes both through the Atlantic coast and eastern France. Bell Beaker pottery has been found in Mallorca and Formentera, but has not been observed in Menorca or Ibiza. Collective burials in dolmen structures in Ibiza could be contrasted against the individual burials in Mallorca. In its latest phase (about 1750–1300 cal BC) the local Beaker context became associated with the distinctive ornamented Boquique pottery demonstrating clear maritime links with the (megalithic) coastal regions of Catalonia, also assessed to be directly related to the late Cogotas complex. In most of the areas of the mainland, Boquique pottery falls into the latter stages of the Bell Beaker complex, as well. Along with other evidence during the earlier Beaker period in the Balearics, as shown by the local presence of elephant ivory objects together with significant Beaker pottery and other finds, this maritime interaction can be shown to have a long tradition. The abundance of different cultural elements that persisted towards the end of the Bronze Age, show a clear continuity of different regional and intrusive traditions.

The presence of perforated Beaker pottery, traditionally considered to be used for making cheese, at Son Ferrandell-Oleza  and at Coval Simó  confirms the introduction of production and conservation of dairy. Also, the presence of spindles at sites like Son Ferrandell-Oleza  or Es Velar d’Aprop  point to knowledge of making thread and textiles from wool. However, more details on the strategies for tending and slaughtering the domestic animals involved are forthcoming. Being traditionally associated with the introduction of metallurgy, the first traces of copper working in the Balearics were also clearly associated with Bell Beakers.

Central Europe

In their large-scale study on radiocarbon dating of the Bell Beakers, J. Müller and S. Willingen established that the Bell Beaker Culture in Central Europe started after 2500 BC. Two great coexisting and separate Central European cultures – the Corded Ware with its regional groups and the Eastern Group of the Bell Beaker Culture – form the background to the Late Copper Age and Early Bronze Age. The Makó-Kosihy-Čaka culture, indigenous to the Carpathians, may be included as a third component. Their development, diffusion and long range changes are determined by the great river systems.

The Bell Beaker settlements are still little known, and have proved remarkably difficult for archaeologists to identify. This allows a modern view of them to contradict results of anthropologic research. The late 20th century view is that the Bell Beaker people, far from being the "warlike invaders" as once described by Gordon Childe (1940), added rather than replaced local late Neolithic traditions into a cultural package and as such did not always and evenly abandon all local traditions. More recent extensive DNA evidence, however, suggests a significant replacement of earlier populations.

Bell Beaker domestic ware has no predecessors in Bohemia and Southern Germany, shows no genetic relation to the local Late Copper Age Corded Ware, nor to other cultures in the area, and is considered something completely new. The Bell Beaker domestic ware of Southern Germany is not as closely related to the Corded Ware as would be indicated by their burial rites. Settlements link the Southern German Bell Beaker culture to the seven regional provinces of the Eastern Group, represented by many settlement traces, especially from Moravia and the Hungarian Bell Beaker-Csepel group being the most important. In 2002, one of the largest Bell Beaker cemeteries in Central Europe was discovered at Hoštice za Hanou (Moravia, Czech Republic).

The relationship to the western Bell Beakers groups, and the contemporary cultures of the Carpathian basin to the south east, is much less. Research in northern Poland shifted the north-eastern frontier of this complex to the western parts of the Baltic with the adjacent Northern European plain. Typical Bell Beaker fragments from the site of Ostrikovac-Djura at the Serbian river Morava were presented at the Riva del Garda conference in 1998, some 100 km south-east of the Csepel Beaker sub-group (modern Hungary). Bell Beaker related material has now been uncovered in a line from the Baltic Sea down to the Adriatic and the Ionian Sea, including the modern states comprising Belarus, Poland, Romania, Serbia, Montenegro, Croatia, Albania, North Macedonia and parts of Greece.

The Bell Beaker culture settlements in southern Germany and in the East-Group show evidence of mixed farming and animal husbandry, and indicators such as millstones and spindle whorls prove the sedentary character of the Bell Beaker people, and the durability of their settlements. Some especially well equipped child-burials seem to indicate sense of predestined social position, indicating a socially complex society. However, analysis of grave furnishing, position within the cemetery, and size and deepness of grave pits did not lead to any strong conclusions on the social divisions.

The Late Copper Age is regarded as a continuous culture system connecting the Upper Rhine valley to the western edge of the Carpathian Basin. Late Copper Age 1 was defined in southern Germany by the connection of the late Cham Culture, Globular Amphora culture, and the older Corded Ware Culture of "beaker group 1" that is also referred to as Horizon A or Step A. Early Bell Beaker Culture intruded into the region at the end of the Late Copper Age 1, around 2600–2550 BC. Middle Bell Beaker corresponds to Late Copper Age 2 and here an east–west Bell Beaker cultural gradient became visible through the difference in the distribution of the groups of beakers with and without handles, cups and bowls, in the three regions Austria–Western Hungary, the Danube catchment area of Southern Germany, and the Upper Rhine/lake Constance/Eastern Switzerland area for all subsequent Bell Beaker periods. This middle Bell Beaker Culture is the main period when almost all the cemeteries in Southern Germany begin. Younger Bell Beaker Culture of Early Bronze Age shows analogies to the Proto-Únětice Culture in Moravia and the Early Nagyrév Culture of the Carpathian Basin.

 

During the Bell Beaker period, a border ran through southern Germany, which culturally divided a northern from a southern area. The northern area was oriented around the Rhine and the Bell Beaker West Group, while the southern area occupied much of the Danube river system and was mainly settled by the homogeneous Bell Beaker East Group. This latter group overlapped with the Corded Ware Culture and other groups of the Late Neolithic and early Bronze Age. Nevertheless, southern Germany shows some independent developments of itself. 

Although a broadly parallel evolution with early, middle, and younger Bell Beaker Culture was detected, the Southern Germany middle Bell Beaker development of metope decorations and stamp and furrow engraving techniques do not appear on beakers in Austria-Western Hungary, and handled beakers are completely absent. It is contemporary to Corded Ware in the vicinity, that has been attested by associated finds of middle Corded Ware (chronologically referred to as "beaker group 2" or Step B) and younger Geiselgasteig Corded Ware beakers ("beaker group 3" or Step C). Bell Beaker Culture in Bavaria used a specific type of copper, which is characterised by combinations of trace elements. This same type of copper was spread over the area of the Bell Beaker East Group.

Previously some archaeologists considered the Bell-beaker people to have lived only within a limited territory of the Carpathian Basin and for a short time, without mixing with the local population. Although there are very few evaluable anthropological finds, the appearance of the characteristic planoccipital (flattened back) Taurid type in the populations of some later cultures (e.g. Kisapostag and Gáta–Wieselburg cultures) suggested a mixture with the local population contradicting such archaeological theories. According to archaeology, the populational groups of the Bell-beakers also took part in the formation of the Gáta-Wieselburg culture on the western fringes of the Carpathian Basin, which could be confirmed with the anthropological Bell Beaker series in Moravia and Germany. In accordance with anthropological evidence, it has been concluded the Bell Beakers intruded in an already established form the southern part of Germany as much as the East Group area.

Ireland

Beakers arrived in Ireland around 2500 BC and fell out of use around 1700 BC. The beaker pottery of Ireland was rarely used as a grave good, but is often found in domestic assemblages from the period. This stands in contrast to the rest of Europe where it is frequently found in both roles. The inhabitants of Ireland used food vessels as a grave good instead. The large, communal passage tombs of the Irish Neolithic were no longer being constructed during the Early Bronze Age (although some, such as Newgrange were re-used). The preferred method of burial seems to have been single graves and cists in the east, or in small wedge tombs in the west. Cremation was also common.

The advent of the Bronze Age Beaker culture in Ireland is accompanied by the destruction of smaller satellite tombs at Knowth and collapses of the great cairn at Newgrange, marking an end to the Neolithic culture of megalithic passage tombs.

Beakers are found in large numbers in Ireland, and the technical innovation of ring-built pottery indicates that the makers were also present. Classification of pottery in Ireland and Britain has distinguished a total of seven intrusive beaker groups originating from the continent and three groups of purely insular character having evolved from them. Five out of seven of the intrusive Beaker groups also appear in Ireland: the European bell group, the All-over cord beakers, the Scottish/North Rhine beakers, the Northern British/Middle Rhine beakers and the Wessex/Middle Rhine beakers. However, many of the features or innovations of Beaker society in Britain never reached Ireland. Instead, quite different customs predominated in the Irish record that were apparently influenced by the traditions of the earlier inhabitants. Some features that are found elsewhere in association to later types of Earlier Bronze Age Beaker pottery, indeed spread to Ireland, however, without being incorporated into the same close and specific association of Irish Beaker context. The Wessex/Middle Rhine gold discs bearing "wheel and cross" motifs that were probably sewn to garments, presumably to indicate status and reminiscent of racquet headed pins found in Eastern Europe, enjoy a general distribution throughout the country, however, never in direct association with beakers.

In 1984, a Beaker period copper dagger blade was recovered from the Sillees River near Ross Lough, County Fermanagh, Northern Ireland. Flint arrow-heads and copper-blade daggers with handle tangs, found in association with Beaker pottery in many other parts of Europe, have a date later than the initial phase of Beaker People activity in Ireland. Also the typical Beaker wristguards seem to have entered Ireland by cultural diffusion only, after the first intrusions, and unlike English and Continental Beaker burials never made it to the graves. The same lack of typical Beaker association applies to the about thirty found stone battle axes. A gold ornament found in County Down that closely resembles a pair of ear-rings from Ermegeira, Portugal, has a composition that suggests it was imported. Incidental finds suggest links to non-British Beaker territories, like a fragment of a bronze blade in County Londonderry that has been likened to the "palmella" points of Iberia, even though the relative scarcity of beakers, and Beaker-compatible material of any kind, in the south-west are regarded as an obstacle to any colonisation directly from Iberia, or even from France. Their greater concentration in the northern part of the country, which traditionally is regarded as the part of Ireland least blessed with sources of copper, has led many authorities to question the role of Beaker People in the introduction of metallurgy to Ireland. However, indications of their use of stream sediment copper, low in traces of lead and arsenic, and Beaker finds connected to mining and metalworking at Ross Island, County Kerry, provide an escape to such doubts.

The featured "food vessels" and cinerary urns (encrusted, collared and cordoned) of the Irish Earlier Bronze Age have strong roots in the western European Beaker tradition. Recently, the concept of these food vessels was discarded and replaced by a concept of two different traditions that rely on typology: the bowl tradition and the vase tradition, the bowl tradition being the oldest as it has been found inserted in existing Neolithic (pre-beaker) tombs, both court tombs and passage tombs. The bowl tradition occurs over the whole country except the south-west and feature a majority of pit graves, both in flat cemeteries and mounds, and a high incidence of uncremated skeletons, often in crouched position. The vase tradition has a general distribution and feature almost exclusively cremation. The flexed skeleton of a man 1.88 meters tall in a cist in a slightly oval round cairn with "food vessel" at Cornaclery, County Londonderry, was described in the 1942 excavation report as "typifying the race of Beaker Folk", although the differences between Irish finds and e.g. the British combination of "round barrows with crouched, unburnt burials" make it difficult to establishes the exact nature of the Beaker People's colonization of Ireland.

In general, the early Irish Beaker intrusions don't attest the overall "Beaker package" of innovations that, once fully developed, swept Europe elsewhere, leaving Ireland behind. The Irish Beaker period is characterised by the earliness of Beaker intrusions, by isolation and by influences and surviving traditions of autochthons.

Beaker culture introduces the practice of burial in single graves, suggesting an Earlier Bronze Age social organisation of family groups. Towards the Later Bronze Age the sites move to potentially fortifiable hilltops, suggesting a more "clan"-type structure. Although the typical Bell Beaker practice of crouched burial has been observed, cremation was readily adopted in accordance with the previous tradition of the autochthons. In a tumulus the find of the extended skeleton of a woman accompanied by the remains of a red deer and a small seven-year-old stallion is noteworthy, including the hint to a Diana-like religion. A few burials seem to indicate social status, though in other contexts an emphasis to special skills is more likely.

One of the most important sites in Ireland during the Beaker period is Ross Island. A series of copper mines from here are the earliest known in Ireland, starting from around 2500 BC (O'Brien 2004). A comparison of chemical traces and lead isotope analysis from these mines with copper artefacts strongly suggests that Ross Island was the sole source of copper in Ireland between the dates 2500–2200 BC. In addition, two thirds of copper artefacts from Britain also display the same chemical and isotopic signature, strongly suggesting that Irish copper was a major export to Britain. Traces of Ross Island copper can be found even further afield; in the Netherlands it makes up 12% of analysed copper artefacts, and Brittany 6% of analysed copper artefacts After 2200 BC there is greater chemical variation in British and Irish copper artefacts, which tallies well with the appearance of other mines in southern Ireland and north Wales. After 2000 BC, other copper sources supersede Ross Island. The latest workings from the Ross Island mines is dated to around 1700 BC.

As well as exporting raw copper/bronze, there were some technical and cultural developments in Ireland that had an important impact on other areas of Europe. Irish food vessels were adopted in northern Britain around 2200 BC and this roughly coincides with a decline in the use of beakers in Britain. The 'bronze halberd' (not to be confused with the medieval halberd) was a weapon in use in Ireland from around 2400–2000 BC. They are essentially broad blades that were mounted horizontally on a meter long handle, giving greater reach and impact than any known contemporary weapon. They were subsequently widely adopted in other parts of Europe, possibly showing a change in the technology of warfare.

Solar symbolism

Ireland has the greatest concentration of gold lunulae and stone wrist-guards in Europe. However, neither of these items were deposited in graves and they tend to be found isolated and at random. 

In some cases gold lunulae have been found with pairs of gold discs, e.g at Coggalbeg in Ireland and Cabeceiras de Basto in Portugal. Both lunulae and discs have been linked to sun worship. Cahill (2015) connects them to a "great solar cult" stretching across western and central Europe to Scandinavia. Cahill suggests that the central part of the lunulae (which is left undecorated) represents a solar boat, which she compares to the gold boat depicted on the Nebra sky disc and to depictions of solar boats from the Nordic Bronze Age, as well as to depictions on pottery from Los Millares in Spain. According to Cahill, pairs of gold discs found with lunulae may therefore represent "the day and night sun", symbolising the movement of the sun from day to night and from east to west. The double-sun motif has also been linked to the mythological Divine Twins, as have ritual depositions of twinned objects, including two swords buried with the Nebra sky disc. 

Scientific analyses have shown that gold used to make both the Irish lunulae and the Nebra sky disc originated from Cornwall, providing a further link between these artefacts. Cornwall was also the likely source of gold used to make artefacts from the Bush Barrow at Stonehenge.

Britain

Beakers arrived in Britain around 2500 BC, with migrations of Yamnaya or Corded Ware-related people, resulting in a near total turnover of the British population. The Beaker-culture declined in use around 2200–2100 BC with the emergence of food vessels and cinerary urns and finally fell out of use around 1700 BC. The earliest British beakers were similar to those from the Rhine, but later styles are most similar to those from Ireland. In Britain, domestic assemblages from this period are very rare, making it hard to draw conclusions about many aspects of society. Most British beakers come from funerary contexts.

Britain's only unique export in this period is thought to be tin. It was probably gathered in streams in Cornwall and Devon as cassiterite pebbles and traded in this raw, unrefined state. It was used to turn copper into bronze from around 2200 BC and widely traded throughout Britain and into Ireland. Other possible European sources of tin are located in Brittany and Iberia, but it is not thought they were exploited so early as these areas did not have bronze until after it was well established in Britain and Ireland.

The most famous site in Britain from this period is Stonehenge, which had its Neolithic form elaborated extensively. Many barrows surround it and an unusual number of 'rich' burials can be found nearby, such as the Amesbury Archer and the later Bush Barrow.

Silbury Hill was also built in the early Bell Beaker period, c. 2470–2350 BC. It may have been built as a burial mound, though this has never been proven. Bayliss et al. (2007) state that the "aggrandisement" of both Stonehenge and Silbury Hill occurred "in close relation to the appearance of novel material culture and practices" introduced by Beaker people. According to Mike Parker Pearson a significantly higher level of labour mobilisation was achieved following the arrival of Beaker people in Britain. The amount of effort that went into building Silbury Hill "was massively more than Stonehenge ... and its dates coincide exactly with the appearance of Beaker burials in Britain." Beaker people also introduced mummification, burial in log coffins and cranial deformation to Britain. 

Another site of particular interest is Ferriby on the Humber Estuary, where western Europe's oldest sewn-plank boats were recovered, dating to as early as c. 2000 BC. A later example is the Dover Boat, dating from 1550 BC.

Italian Peninsula

The Italian Peninsula's most affected areas are the Po Valley, in particular the area of Lake Garda, and Tuscany. The bell-shaped vases appear in these areas of central and northern Italy as "foreign elements" integrated in the pre-existing Remedello and Rinaldone cultures.

Graves with Beaker artefacts have been discovered in the Brescia area, like that of Ca' di Marco (Fiesse), while in central Italy, bell-shaped glasses were found in the tomb of Fosso Conicchio (Viterbo).

The Bell Beaker culture was followed by the Polada culture and Proto-Apennine culture.

Sardinia

Sardinia has been in contact with extra-insular communities in Corsica, Tuscany, Liguria and Provence since the Stone Age. From the late third millennium BC on, comb-impressed Beaker ware, as well as other Beaker material in Monte Claro contexts, has been found (mostly in burials, such as Domus de Janas), demonstrating continuing relationships with the western Mediterranean. Elsewhere, Beaker material has been found stratigraphically above Monte Claro and at the end of the Chalcolithic period in association with the related Bronze Age Bonnanaro culture (1800–1600 BC), for which C-14 dates calibrate to c. 2250 BC. There is virtually no evidence in Sardinia of external contacts in the early second millennia, apart from late Beakers and close parallels between Bonnannaro pottery and that of the North Italian Polada culture.

Like elsewhere in Europe and in the Mediterranean area, the Bell Beaker culture in Sardinia (2100–1800 BC) is characterised by the typical ceramics decorated with overlaid horizontal bands and associated finds: brassards, V-pierced buttons etc.; for the first time gold items appeared on the island (collier of the tomb of Bingia 'e Monti, Gonnostramatza). The different styles and decorations of the ceramics which succeed through the time allow to split the Beaker culture in Sardinia into three chronological phases: A1 (2100–2000 BC), A2 (2000–1900 BC), B (1900–1800 BC). In these various phases is observable the succession of two components of different geographical origin: the first "Franco-Iberian" and the second "Central European".

It appears likely that Sardinia was the intermediary that brought Beaker culture to Sicily.

Sicily
The Beaker was introduced in Sicily from Sardinia and spread mainly in the north-west and south-west of the island. In the northwest and in the Palermo kept almost intact its cultural and social characteristics, while in the south-west there was a strong integration with local cultures. The only known single bell-shaped glass in eastern Sicily was found in Syracuse.

Jutland

In Denmark, large areas of forested land were cleared to be used for pasture and the growing of cereals during the Single Grave culture and in the Late Neolithic Period. Faint traces of Bell Beaker influence can be recognised already in the pottery of the Upper Grave phase of the Single Grave period, and even of the late Ground Grave phase, such as occasional use of AOO-like or zoned decoration and other typical ornamentation, while Bell Beaker associated objects such as wristguards and small copper trinkets, also found their way into this northern territories of the Corded Ware Culture. Domestic sites with Beakers only appear 200–300 years after the first appearance of Bell Beakers in Europe, at the early part of the Danish Late Neolithic Period (LN I) starting at 2350 BC. These sites are concentrated in northern Jutland around the Limfjord and on the Djursland peninsula, largely contemporary to the local Upper Grave Period. In east central Sweden and western Sweden, barbed wire decoration characterised the period 2460–1990 BC, linked to another Beaker derivation of northwestern Europe.

Stone and copper arms trade
Northern Jutland has abundant sources of high quality flint, which had previously attracted industrious mining, large-scale production, and the comprehensive exchange of flint objects: notably axes and chisels. The Danish Beaker period, however, was characterised by the manufacture of lanceolate flint daggers, described as a completely new material form without local antecedents in flint and clearly related to the style of daggers circulating elsewhere in Beaker dominated Europe. Presumably Beaker culture spread from here to the remainder of Denmark, and to other regions in Scandinavia and northern Germany as well. Central and eastern Denmark adopted this dagger fashion and, to a limited degree, also archer's equipment characteristic to Beaker culture, although here Beaker pottery remained less common.

Also, the spread of metallurgy in Denmark is intimately related to the Beaker representation in northern Jutland. The LN I metalwork is distributed throughout most of Denmark, but a concentration of early copper and gold coincides with this core region, hence suggesting a connection between Beakers and the introduction of metallurgy. Most LN I metal objects are distinctly influenced by the western European Beaker metal industry, gold sheet ornaments and copper flat axes being the predominant metal objects. The LN I copper flat axes divide into As-Sb-Ni copper, recalling so-called Dutch Bell Beaker copper and the As-Ni copper found occasionally in British and Irish Beaker contexts, the mining region of Dutch Bell Beaker copper being perhaps Brittany; and the Early Bronze Age Singen (As-Sb-Ag-Ni) and Ösenring (As-Sb-Ag) coppers having a central European – probably Alpine – origin.

Connections with other parts of Beaker culture

The Beaker group in northern Jutland forms an integrated part of the western European Beaker Culture, while western Jutland provided a link between the Lower Rhine area and northern Jutland. The local fine-ware pottery of Beaker derivation reveal links with other Beaker regions in western Europe, most specifically the Veluwe group at the Lower Rhine (Netherlands). Concurrent introduction of metallurgy shows that some people must have crossed cultural boundaries. Danish Beakers are contemporary with the earliest Early Bronze Age (EBA) of the East Group of Bell Beakers in central Europe, and with the floruit of Beaker cultures of the West Group in western Europe. The latter comprise Veluwe and Epi-Maritime in Continental northwestern Europe and the Middle Style Beakers (Style 2) in insular western Europe.

The interaction between the Beaker groups on the Veluwe Plain and in Jutland must, at least initially, have been quite intensive. All-over ornamented (AOO) and All-over-corded (AOC), and particularly Maritime style beakers are featured, although from a fairly late context and possibly rather of Epi-maritime style, equivalent to the situation in the north of the Netherlands, where Maritime ornamentation continued after it ceased in the central region of Veluwe and were succeeded c. 2300 BC by beakers of the Veluwe and Epi-Maritime style.

Clusters of Late Neolithic Beaker presence similar to northern Jutland appear as pockets or "islands" of Beaker Culture in northern Europe, such as Mecklenburg, Schleswig-Holstein, and southern Norway. In northern central Poland Beaker-like representations even occur in a contemporary EBA setting. The frequent occurrence of Beaker pottery in settlements points at a large-scaled form of social identity or cultural identity, or perhaps an ethnic identity.

Burial practices

In eastern Denmark and Scania one-person graves occur primarily in flat grave cemeteries. This is a continuation of the burial custom characterising the Scanian Battle-axe Culture, often to continue into the early Late Neolithic. Also in northern Jutland, the body of the deceased was normally arranged lying on its back in an extended position, but a typical Bell Beaker contracted position occurs occasionally. Typical to northern Jutland, however, cremations have been reported, also outside the Beaker core area, once within the context of an almost full Bell Beaker equipment.

Social transition
The introductory phase of the manufacture and use of flint daggers, around 2350 BC, must all in all be characterised as a period of social change. Apel argued that an institutionalised apprenticeship system must have existed. Craftsmanship was transmitted by inheritance in certain families living in the vicinity of abundant resources of high-quality flint. Debbie Olausson's (1997) examinations indicate that flint knapping activities, particularly the manufacture of daggers, reflect a relatively low degree of craft specialisation, probably in the form of a division of labour between households.

Noteworthy was the adoption of European-style woven wool clothes kept together by pins and buttons in contrast to the earlier usage of clothing made of leather and plant fibres. Two-aisled timber houses in Late Neolithic Denmark correspond to similar houses in southern Scandinavia and at least parts of central Scandinavia and lowland northern Germany. In Denmark, this mode of building houses is clearly rooted in a Middle Neolithic tradition. In general, Late Neolithic house building styles were shared over large areas of northern and central Europe. Towards the transition to LN II some farm houses became extraordinarily large.

End of a distinct Beaker culture
The cultural concepts originally adopted from Beaker groups at the lower Rhine blended or integrated with local Late Neolithic Culture. For a while the region was set apart from central and eastern Denmark, that evidently related more closely to the early Únětice culture across the Baltic Sea. Before the turn of the millennium the typical Beaker features had gone, their total duration being 200–300 years at the most.

A similar picture of cultural integration is featured among Bell Beakers in central Europe, thus challenging previous theories of Bell Beakers as an elitist or purely super-structural phenomenon. The connection with the East Group Beakers of Únětice had intensified considerably in LN II, thus triggering a new social transformation and innovations in metallurgy that would announce the actual beginning of the Northern Bronze Age.

See also

 Beaker (disambiguation)
 Amesbury Archer
 Prehistoric Britain
 Prehistoric Iberia
 Bronze Age Britain
 Cornish Bronze Age

Notes

References

Sources

Further reading
 
 
 Mallory J.P. (1997) "Beaker Culture". Encyclopedia of Indo-European Culture, Fitzroy Dearborn.

External links

 BBC – History – Bronze Age Britain
 Historical model of settling and spread of Bell Beakers Culture in the mediterranean France
 Bell beakers from west to east
 All Bell Beaker scientific articles on line free access